Đurković is a surname of Serbo-Croatian language origin. Notable people with the surname include:

Bojan Đurković (born 1989), Croatian sports shooter
Božidar Đurković (born 1972), Serbian footballer
Enis Đurković (born 1989), Slovenian footballer
Ivan Đurković (born 1986), Montenegrin handballer
Ljubinko Đurković (born 1962), Serbian politician and military officer
Ljubomir Đurković (1952–2022), Montenegrin author and poet
Miloš Đurković (born 1956), Bosnian Serb footballer and manager
Nikola Đurković (born 1994), Montenegrin footballer
Nikola Đurković (musician) (1812–1876), Serbian musician and theater artist
Pavel Đurković (1772–1830), Serbian painter and iconographer
Petar Đurković (1908–1981), Serbian astronomer
Ratko Đurković (born 1975), Montenegrin handballer and coach
Slaviša Đurković (born 1968), Montenegrin footballer
Svetlana Đurković (born 1974), Croatian-born Bosnian anthropologist and human rights activist
Tatjana Đurković (born 1996), Montenegrin football defender
Zorica Ðurković (born 1957), Yugoslav basketball player

See also
Đurkovići, village in the municipality of Podgorica, Montenegro
Duraković, surname
Đurak, surname

Serbo-Croatian-language surnames